Vít Valenta (born 4 January 1983 in Uherské Hradiště) is a former Czech professional football player. He played as a midfielder and was known for his long throws.

Valenta was noticed by PSV Eindhoven at the age of 17, while playing UEFA Intertoto Cup with Synot Staré Město. He went to Lommel pretty soon, because Valenta was too expensive for PSV. Czech Republic was not part of the European Union at that time, so PSV was ought to pay Valenta € 400.000 per year. But only one season later, Lommel went bankrupt.

Valenta did not immediately find a new team, so he signed an amateur contract with Dutch Hoofdklasse side HSC '21. He immediately shone out there at that level, and signed a new professional contract one season later with Cercle Brugge. Cercle found in him the successor of Harald Meyssen, but Valenta was never able fulfill the expectations. But in January 2007, Cercle released Valenta on a free transfer.

Valenta went back to Netherlands to maintain his form, with FC Volendam. After 4 months, Valenta was granted a work permit, so Volendam was able to offer Valenta a contract.

Valenta returned to Czech Republic by signing a 3-year contract with 1. FC Slovácko where he quickly became the team's captain.
However, due to a dispute with Slovácko's manager Miroslav Soukup and the end of his contract he decided to retire from professional football at the age of only 28. He joined amateur team SV Großweikersdorf playing sixth-tier Austrian league. He trains youth in SK Borsice.

References

 Profile at iDNES.cz
 

1984 births
Living people
Czech footballers
1. FC Slovácko players
Association football midfielders
PSV Eindhoven players
Cercle Brugge K.S.V. players
FC Volendam players
Belgian Pro League players
Czech expatriate footballers
Czech expatriate sportspeople in Belgium
Expatriate footballers in Belgium
Czech expatriate sportspeople in the Netherlands
Expatriate footballers in the Netherlands
K.F.C. Lommel S.K. players